The Road to Mecca is a 1991 South African drama film starring Kathy Bates.  It is based on Athol Fugard's play of the same name.

Plot

Cast
Kathy Bates as Elsa Barlow
Yvonne Bryceland as Miss Helen
Athol Fugard as Rev. Marius Byleveld

References

External links
 

South African drama films
South African films based on plays
1991 drama films
1991 films
1990s English-language films
English-language South African films